Kanzach is a town in the district of Biberach in Baden-Württemberg in Germany.

References

Biberach (district)
Württemberg